Zarateana is a genus of small, air-breathing land snails, terrestrial pulmonate gastropod mollusks in the family Geomitridae, the hairy snails and their allies.  

The genus is endemic to the Iberian Peninsula.

Species 
The genus contains two species:
 Zarateana arganica (Servain, 1880) type species
 Zarateana rocandioi (Ortiz de Zárate y López, 1950)

References 

 
Geomitridae